The 35th Vanier Cup was played on November 27, 1999, at the SkyDome in Toronto, Ontario, and decided the CIAU football champion for the 1999 season. The Laval Rouge et Or won the first championship in school history by defeating the Saint Mary's Huskies by a score of 14–10.

Game summary
Laval Rouge et Or (14) - TDs, Lefebvre (2); cons., Gagne (2).

Saint Mary's Huskies (10) - TDs, Perez; FGs Currie; cons., Currie.

References

External links
 Official website

Vanier Cup
Vanier Cup
1999 in Toronto
November 1999 sports events in Canada
Canadian football competitions in Toronto